John Francis McMartin (August 21, 1929 – July 6, 2016) was an American actor of stage, film and television.

Life and career 
McMartin was born in Warsaw, Indiana, on August 21, 1929, and raised in St. Cloud, Minnesota. After graduating from high school, he joined the United States Army and became a paratrooper in the 101st Airborne Division. He attended Columbia College Chicago, but did not graduate and later attended college in New York. He made his off-Broadway debut in Little Mary Sunshine in 1959, opposite Eileen Brennan and Elmarie Wendel. He won a Theatre World Award for his role as Corporal Billy Jester, and married one of the show's producers, Cynthia Baer, in 1960; they divorced in 1971.

McMartin's first Broadway appearance was as Forrest Noble in The Conquering Hero in 1961, which was followed by Blood, Sweat and Stanley Poole. He created the role of Oscar in Sweet Charity in 1966, opposite Gwen Verdon, garnering a Tony nomination, and played the role again in the 1969 film opposite Shirley MacLaine. He was reportedly cast in Stephen Sondheim's A Funny Thing Happened on the Way to the Forum in 1962, but his role was cut before the show opened.

McMartin later starred in the original Broadway production of Sondheim's Follies opposite Alexis Smith in 1971 as Benjamin Stone, introducing the ballad "The Road You Didn't Take". His association with Sondheim continued, as he appeared in A Little Night Music as Frederick at the Ahmanson Theatre, Los Angeles, in 1991. The reviewer for the Orange County Register wrote that McMartin was "aggressively deadpan as her rediscovered old flame". 

He appeared in the first Broadway revival of Into the Woods in 2002, in the dual role of the Narrator and the Mysterious Man.

Other Broadway roles include the Narrator in Happy New Year, Ben in A Little Family Business (adapted by Jay Presson Allen, 1982), Donner in Tom Stoppard's Artist Descending a Staircase, Cap'n Andy in Kern and Hammerstein's Show Boat (1994), and Uncle Willie in Cole Porter's High Society (1998). He also had a role as the American Revolutionary naval hero John Paul Jones in the unsuccessful Loesser/Spewack musical Pleasures and Palaces, which closed in Detroit. In regional theater, he originated the role of Benteen in the Folger Theater Group's 1979 production of Custer at the Kennedy Center.

McMartin was a leading member of the New Phoenix Repertory Company during its three Broadway seasons in the early 1970s, appearing onstage in Eugene O'Neill's The Great God Brown (opposite Katherine Helmond), Molière's Dom Juan, and Luigi Pirandello's The Rules of the Game.

McMartin played Anton Schell opposite Chita Rivera in Kander and Ebb's musical The Visit at the Goodman Theatre. He created the roles of J.V. "Major" Bouvier and Norman Vincent Peale in Grey Gardens, opposite Mary Louise Wilson and Christine Ebersole. He played Thomas Jefferson in the original cast of John Guare's A Free Man of Color at Lincoln Center (2010–11), and Elisha Whitney in the 2011 Broadway revival of Anything Goes, opposite Jessica Walter.

On television, McMartin appeared on the soap opera As the World Turns as Ed Rice. He was later in the CBS drama East Side West Side and the first two seasons of Beauty and the Beast (1987) as Charles Chandler, father of Catherine (Linda Hamilton). He also appeared in The Golden Girls (Season 2) as Frank Leahy who, unbeknownst to Dorothy (Bea Arthur) who is romantically attracted to him, is a priest. He appeared as the Rev. Dr. Dan Bradford on The Bob Newhart Show in "Somebody Down Here Likes Me". He appeared on Cheers in "The Visiting Lecher". He appeared as radio personality Fletcher Grey on Frasier. He appeared in four episodes of Murder, She Wrote. He also appeared as Shirley Jones's love interest in The Partridge Family episode "When Mother Gets Married".

McMartin's film roles include the foreign editor in All the President's Men (1976), a senator in Brubaker (1980), a political advisor in Blow Out (1981), and millionaire Mr. Forrester in Legal Eagles (1986).

Death 
McMartin died of cancer in Manhattan on July 6, 2016, aged 86. He was survived by his two daughters from his marriage, and his longtime partner, actress Charlotte Moore, artistic director of the Irish Repertory Theatre.

Filmography

Film

Television

Stage

Broadway

Off-Broadway 

Other Theatre Credits

Awards and nominations 

Honor
2009 Inducted into the American Theater Hall of Fame.

References

External links 

1929 births
2016 deaths
American male film actors
American male musical theatre actors
American male television actors
American male singers
Male actors from Minnesota